Tariq Quinton Castro-Fields (born January 14, 1999) is an American football cornerback for the Washington Commanders of the National Football League (NFL). He played college football at Penn State. Castro-Fields was drafted by the San Francisco 49ers in the sixth round of the 2022 NFL Draft, but was released prior to start of the season and was claimed off waivers by Washington.

Early life and high school career
Castro-Fields grew up in Upper Marlboro, Maryland and attended the Riverdale Baptist School. Castro-Fields was rated a four-star recruit and committed to play college football at Penn State after considering offers from Maryland and Alabama.

College career
Castro-Fields played in 12 games as a freshman and finished the season with 10 total tackles, three passes broken up, and one interception. As a junior, Castro-Fields had 52 tackles and led the team with two interceptions and eight passes broken up. He played in three games during Penn State's COVID-19-shortened 2020 season, missing the rest due to injury. Castro-Fields decided to utilize the extra year of eligibility granted to college athletes who played in the 2020 season due to the COVID-19 pandemic and return to Penn State for a fifth season.

Professional career

San Francisco 49ers
Castro-Fields was selected in the sixth round of the 2022 NFL Draft by the San Francisco 49ers. He was waived on August 30, 2022.

Washington Commanders
On August 31, 2022, Castro-Fields was claimed by the Washington Commanders. He was placed on injured reserve on October 21.

References

External links
 Washington Commanders bio
 Penn State Nittany Lions bio

1999 births
Living people
Players of American football from Maryland
Sportspeople from the Washington metropolitan area
American football cornerbacks
Penn State Nittany Lions football players
People from Upper Marlboro, Maryland
San Francisco 49ers players
Washington Commanders players